Lead On is the fifteenth studio album by American country music artist George Strait. Released in 1994 on MCA Records, the album was certified platinum in the U.S. for sales of one million copies. It includes the singles "The Big One", "You Can't Make a Heart Love Somebody", "Lead On", and "Adalida", which respectively reached No. 1, No. 1, No. 7 and No. 3 on the Hot Country Songs charts between 1994 and 1995. The album's title track was co-written by Teddy Gentry, who at the time was a member of the band Alabama. "I Met a Friend of Yours Today" was originally recorded by Mel Street.

Track listing

Personnel
As listed in liner notes.
Eddie Bayers – drums
Stuart Duncan – fiddle, mandolin
Buddy Emmons – steel guitar
Paul Franklin – steel guitar
Steve Gibson – acoustic guitar, electric guitar
Liana Manis – background vocals
Brent Mason – acoustic guitar, electric guitar
Steve Nathan – organ, synthesizer
Matt Rollings – piano, keyboards
George Strait – lead vocals
Glenn Worf – bass guitar
Curtis Young – background vocals
D. Bergen White – string arrangements

Charts

Weekly charts

Year-end charts

References

1994 albums
George Strait albums
MCA Records albums
Albums produced by Tony Brown (record producer)